James Augustus Wendell (January 1, 1869 in Fort Plain, Montgomery County, New York – May 10, 1922 in Albany, Albany County, New York) was an American politician.

Life
He studied law for a time, but did not finish. Instead, he worked as a clerk at the Fort Plain National Bank. In 1894 he entered the Comptroller's department and remained there for the rest of his life. For ten years he was Deputy Comptroller and in 1920 was elected New York State Comptroller on the Republican ticket. At the time, he was the first state cabinet officer who had been a career employee of his department.

In 1920, his predecessor Eugene M. Travis, Wendell and bond broker Albert L. Judson were indicted on charges of grand larceny. It was charged that Travis as Comptroller and Wendell as Deputy Comptroller had bought from Judson bonds at prices above the market for the State Sinking Fund, and so caused the loss of $230,000 for the State. The charges were dismissed in October 1921 because of lack of evidence to show criminal intent.

He died of apoplexy.

Sources
 His father's obit in NYT on June 20, 1915
 The indictments, in NYT on December 30, 1920
 The impending prosecution, in NYT on April 7, 1921
 The trial continues, questions of jurisdiction, in NYT on June 28, 1921
 Charges dismissed, in NYT on October 7, 1921
 Obit in NYT on May 11, 1922

1869 births
1922 deaths
New York State Comptrollers
People from Fort Plain, New York
New York (state) Republicans